Cabinet is the debut studio album of the Swedish death metal band Spawn of Possession.

Track listing

Credits
 Jonas Bryssling - Guitar
 Jonas Karlsson - Guitar
 Niklas Dewerud - Bass
 Dennis Röndum - Drums, vocals

References

2003 debut albums
Spawn of Possession albums
Unique Leader Records albums